Adherents of Sikhism follow a number of prohibitions. As with any followers of any faith or group, adherence varies by each individual.

Prohibitions 
These prohibitions are strictly followed by initiated Khalsa Sikhs who have undergone baptism. While the Sikh gurus did not enforce religion and did not believe in forcing people to follow any particular religion in general, the Sikh community does encourage all people to become better individuals by following the Guru's Way (Gur-mat), as opposed to living life without the Guru's code of disciple (Man-mat):

4 major transgressions:
 Hair removal – Hair cutting, trimming, removing, shaving, plucking, threading, dyeing, or any other alteration from any body part is strictly forbidden.
 Eating the meat of an animal slaughtered the Muslim way (Kutha meat). This is the absolute minimum required by all initiated Sikhs. Many Sikhs refrain from eating non-vegetarian food, and believe all should follow this diet. This is due to various social, cultural, political, and familial aspects. As such, there has always been major disagreement among Sikhs over the issue of eating non-vegetarian food. Sikhs following the rahit (code of conduct) of the Damdami Taksal & AKJ also subscribe to this view. The Akali Nihangs have traditionally eaten meat and are famous for performing Jhatka. Thus, there is a wide range of views that exist on the issue of a proper "Sikh diet" in the Panth. Nonetheless, all Sikhs agree with the minimum consensus that meat slaughtered via the Muslim (Halal) or Jewish (Shechita) methods is strictly against Sikh dogma and principles. The Akal Takht represents the final authority on controversial issues concerning the Sikh Panth (community or collective). The Hukamnama (edict or clarification), issued by Akal Takht Jathedar Sadhu Singh Bhaura dated February 15, 1980, states that eating meat does not go against the code of conduct of the Sikhs. Amritdhari Sikhs can eat meat as long as it is Jhatka meat.
 Adultery: Cohabiting with a person other than one's spouse (sexual relations with anyone who you are not married to- originally a prohibition on sexual intercourse with Muslim women, an injunction was made by Guru Gobind Singh to not seize them during warfare as sexual contact with them was seen as polluting. Kahn Singh Nabha of the Singh Sabha movement had later inferred that the Guru's command was construed as a prohibition on intercourse with a woman other than one's wife.)
 Intoxication – A Sikh must not take hemp (cannabis), opium, liquor, tobacco, cocaine, narcotics, etc. In short, any intoxicant is not allowed. Cannabis is generally prohibited, but ritually consumed in edible form by some Sikhs. Some Sikh groups, like the Damdami Taksal, are even opposed to drinking caffeine in Indian tea. Indian tea is almost always served in Sikh Gurudwaras around the world. Some Akali Nihang groups consume cannabis-containing shaheedi degh, purportedly to help in meditation.Sūkha parshaad, "Dry-sweet", is the term Akali Nihangs use to refer to it. It was traditionally crushed and consumed as a liquid, especially during festivals like Hola Mohalla. It is never smoked, as this practice is forbidden in Sikhism. In 2001, Jathedar Santa Singh, the leader of Budha Dal, along with 20 chiefs of Nihang sects, refused to accept the ban on consumption of  shaheedi degh by the apex Sikh clergy of Akal Takht - in order to preserve their traditional practices. According to a recent BBC article, "Traditionally they also drank shaheedi degh, an infusion of cannabis, to become closer with God". Baba Santa Singh was excommunicated and replaced with Baba Balbir Singh, who agreed to shun the consumption of bhang.

Other mentioned practices to be avoided, as per the Sikh Rehat Maryada:
 Piercing of the nose or ears for wearing ornaments is forbidden for Sikh men and women.
 Female infanticide: A Sikh should not kill his daughter; nor should he maintain any relationship with a killer of daughter.
 A Sikh shall not steal, form dubious associations or engage in gambling.
 It is not proper for a Sikh woman to wear veil or keep her face hidden.
 Sikhs cannot wear any token of other faiths. Sikhs must not have their head bare or wear caps. They also cannot wear any ornaments piercing through any part of the body.
 Hereditary priestly class – Sikhism does not have priests, as they were abolished by Guru Gobind Singh (the 10th Guru of Sikhism). The only position he left was a Granthi to look after the Guru Granth Sahib; any Sikh is free to become Granthi or read from the Guru Granth Sahib.
 Blind spirituality: Idolatry, superstitions, and rituals should not be observed or followed, including pilgrimages, fasting, and ritual purification; circumcision; idol or grave worship; and compulsory wearing of the veil for women. Observation of the five Ks, however, is not considered blind superstition, as they are intended to help Sikhs in their everyday life.
 Material obsession: Obsession with material wealth is not encouraged in Sikhism.
 Sacrifice of creatures: Animal sacrifice to celebrate holy occasions are forbidden.
 Non-family-oriented living: Sikhs are discouraged from living as a recluse, beggar, yogi, monastic (monk/nun), or celibate.
 Worthless talk: Bragging, gossip, lying, slander, "backstabbing," et cetera, are not permitted. The Guru Granth Sahib tells the Sikh, "your mouth has not stopped slandering and gossiping about others. Your service is useless and fruitless."

Violation of prohibitions 

Not all Sikh-identified people subscribe to these prohibitions. The Sahajdhari Sikhs reject most of the prohibitions, including trimming of hair (kesh). Some young Sikhs are now cutting their hair to the dismay of spiritual leaders. According to the Sikh clergy, "the fad among youth to shed the pagri" is being observed more commonly among the Sikh youth in Punjab than Sikhs in other Indian states.

Nihang Sikhs of Punjab, who are defenders of historic Sikh shrines, are an exception and consume an intoxicant called bhang (cannabis sativa), opium and other narcotics to help in meditation, saying that it is 'old tradition' (Punjabi: puratan maryada). Bhang is common in India.  In 2001, Baba Santa Singh, the Jathedar of Budha Dal, along with 20 Nihang chiefs, refused to accept the ban on the consumption of bhang by the highest Sikh clergy. Baba Santa Singh was excommunicated and replaced with Baba Balbir Singh, who agreed to shun the consumption of bhang.

The Udasis, who consider themselves as a denomination of Sikhism, lay emphasis on being ascetic, thus violating the "Non-family-oriented living" principle. Sri Chand, the ascetic son of Guru Nanak, was the founder of the Udasi.

Article XXV of the Sikh Code of Conduct (Sikh Rehat Maryada) clearly states that any Amritdhari Khalsa Sikh who has defaulted in the Sikh discipline should approach any nearby Sikh congregation and confess the transgression in public in front of the local congregation. The congregation should then, in the holy presence of Guru Granth Sahib, elect from among themselves five beloved ones who should deliberate over the individual's fault and propose an appropriate chastisement (punishment) for it. The congregation should not take stubborn stance and should be forgiving in essence and attempt to grant the individual pardon. The defaulter should not argue about the chastisement or punishment and accept it all whole heartedly as the will of the collective Sikh body, the Guru Khalsa Panth. The punishment imposed should be some kind of service, especially some service that can be performed with hands. Finally an Ardas for correction should be performed.

See also 

 Rehat
 Diet in Sikhism
 Cannabis and Sikhism

References

External links 
 Fools Who Wrangle Over Flesh
 Adobe Version of Fools Who Wrangle Over Flesh
 Professor Gurbax Singh Dhillon – Meat Eating and Rehat Maryada
 Video Showing Jhatka at Hazoor Sahib
 The Myth of Goat Sacrifice and Hazoor Sahib
 Tenets of Guru Gobind Singh by Baldev Singh
 Sikh History on Diet
 Sikh Scholar Views on Diet

Sikh beliefs
Sikh terminology
Sikh practices